Athanasios Tousias Botsaris the younger, (1792-1827), was a Souliote commander and fighter of the Greek War of Independence. The son cousin of Markos Botsaris and the grandson of Giorgis Botsaris , he took part in many battles and enjoyed the admiration of Philhellenes.

Life
Tousias was born in Souli in 1792 two months after the death of his father, in whose memory he received the same name. He distinguished himself in all cases of involvement of the Souliots. Later in his life, he became deputy leader of the corps of Souliots commanded by his cousin Markos Botsaris . He fought with him both in the defense of Souli and in Western Greece as well as in Karpenisi.
He was the leader of the Legislative Corps in Nafplio.

He also took part in the siege of Messolonghi where he excelled in the battles fought there. Later he followed Georgios Karaiskakis to Nafplio and from there to his campaign in Attica where he finally fell fighting in Phaleron on April 22, 1827.

He was admired by general Richard Church and admiral Lord Thomas Cochran, and they ordered him to be buried in Salamis with honors next to the body of Karaiskakis.

References

Bibliography
"Great Greek Encyclopedia" vol. 17th, p.716

Souliotes
1792 births
1827 deaths